Weigle Barn was listed on the National Register of Historic Places in 2016.

It was built in c.1890 by Jacob Weigle as a bank barn. A gable-roof barn addition was added in c.1920.

References

Barns on the National Register of Historic Places in Kansas
Buildings and structures completed in 1890
Cowley County, Kansas
Barns in Kansas